This is a list of The Movie Show on ITV2 episodes.

Series One (2011)

Lists of British non-fiction television series episodes